The Making of the Mob: New York is an American television miniseries, and the first season of The Making of the Mob. It follows notorious New York gangster Lucky Luciano and his rise in the New York City crime mob, alongside Meyer Lansky, Frank Costello, Bugsy Siegel, and Vito Genovese. It is produced by Stephen David and aired from June 15 to August 3, 2015, on AMC in eight parts.

A ratings success, the series led to a renewal by AMC for a second season, subtitled Chicago, which documents the emergence of organized crime in the American Midwest through the rise and fall of the iconic gangster Al Capone.

Plot
Opening Introduction (narrated by Ray Liotta, who narrated the entire series):

Release
The first trailer, released on April 12, 2015, promoted the "8-part premiere event" and June 15, 2015 release date, and featured the tagline, "Lucky Luciano is the ruler of the most powerful criminal organization this city has ever known."

The series premiered in Australia on Arena on December 9, 2015.

Cast

Main
 Rich Graff as Charles "Lucky" Luciano
 Ian Bell (actor) as Meyer Lansky
 Anthony DiCarlo as Frank Costello
 Jonathan C. Stewart as Benjamin "Bugsy" Siegel
 Craig Thomas Rivela as Vito Genovese

Recurring
 Gus Zucco as Albert Anastasia
 Stelio Savante as Joe Masseria
 Umberto Celisano as Al Capone
 Roberto De Felice as Salvatore Maranzano
 James Kacey as Joe Bonanno 
 Richard L. Adams as Ralph the Booker
 Adam Jonas Segaller as Thomas E. Dewey
 Sam Little as Abe Reles 
 Evan Boymel as Louis Lepke Buchalter
 Christopher Morrow as Dutch Schultz 
 Noah Forrest as Carlo Gambino	
 Caleb McDaniel as Tommy Gagliano
 James Davenjay as Pete La Tempa
 Anthony Bisciello as Joe Profaci
 Gregory Cioffi as Tommy Lucchese	
 Daniel Jordano as Vincent Mangano
 Sam McCrea as William C. Dodge
 Raffaela Perra as Igea Lissoni
 Jessica Brodkin as Lauretta Giegerman Costello
 Yeshe Pfeifer as Anna Genovese 
 Rick Borgia as Older Lucky Luciano
 Rachel Whitman Groves as "Cokey Flo" Florence Brown  
 Marija Skangale as Galina "Gay" Orlova

Interviews
Each episode features several interviews from celebrities, authors, historians and political figures.

Rudy Giuliani – former mayor of New York City 
Selwyn Raab – author, Five Families 
David Pietrusza – author, Rothstein
Meyer Lansky II – grandson of Meyer Lansky
Michael Green – historian, University of Nevada Las Vegas
Rich Cohen – author, Tough Jews
Vincent Pastore – actor, The Sopranos 
Alexander Hortis – author, The Mob and the City
Gay Talese – author, Honor Thy Father
Richard Hammer – author, The Last Testament of Lucky Luciano
Joe Mantegna – actor, The Godfather Part III
Salvatore Polisi – former Mafia associate 
Chazz Palminteri – actor, A Bronx Tale
Sonny Grosso – retired New York City Police Department detective
Frank Vincent – actor, Goodfellas
Thomas Dewey III – grandson of Thomas Dewey
Frankie Valli – singer, The Four Seasons
Oscar Goodman – former mayor of Las Vegas
Ellen Poulsen – author, The Case Against Lucky Luciano
Drea de Matteo – actress, The Sopranos
Edward McDonald – federal prosecutor
Edwin Torres – New York Supreme Court judge
H.W. Brands – historian, University of Texas at Austin

Episodes

Reception
The Making of the Mob: New York received mixed reviews from critics. On Metacritic, the series has a score of 59 out of 100, based on 6 reviews, indicating "mixed or average reviews". On Rotten Tomatoes, the series has a rating of 40%, based on 5 reviews.

Brian Lowry of Variety writes, "The Making of the Mob: New York will merely remind fans of quality drama how much they miss Boardwalk Empire. The dialogue is generally muted underneath the narration and a positively abusive musical score, which never approximates anything less than a swelling crescendo."

Kyle Anderson of Entertainment Weekly writes, "While the presentation can get a little stilted, Making is a relatively clear-eyed look at a still-gripping mutation of the American dream."

References

External links

2015 American television seasons
2010s American drama television miniseries
Cultural depictions of Lucky Luciano
Cultural depictions of Al Capone
Cultural depictions of Bugsy Siegel
Cultural depictions of Meyer Lansky
Cultural depictions of Dutch Schultz
Cultural depictions of Albert Anastasia
Cultural depictions of Joe Masseria
Cultural depictions of Salvatore Maranzano
Cultural depictions of Vito Genovese
Cultural depictions of Louis Buchalter
Cultural depictions of Carlo Gambino
Television series based on actual events
Works about the American Mafia
Works about Jewish-American organized crime